Marcelo de Araújo Pitaluga Filho (born 20 December 2002) is a Brazilian footballer who plays as a goalkeeper for Macclesfield on loan from Liverpool.

Career
Pitaluga started his career with Brazilian side Fluminense. In 2020, he signed for Liverpool in the English Premier League. In 2022, Pitaluga was sent on loan to English eighth tier club Macclesfield. He made 16 league appearances for the club before an ankle injury sufferered in November saw him return to Liverpool.

References

External links

  

2002 births
Association football goalkeepers
Brazil youth international footballers
Brazilian expatriate footballers
Brazilian expatriate sportspeople in England
Brazilian footballers
Brazilian people of German descent 
Expatriate footballers in England
Fluminense FC players
Liverpool F.C. players
Living people
Macclesfield F.C. players
Sportspeople from Niterói
Northern Premier League players